Speedie Date is a web series which debuted on December 1, 2008, on Strike.TV, an internet portal created by Hollywood writers during the 2007-2008 Writers Guild of America (WGA) strike. Each of the ten scripted episodes in the series is a different two-person speed date. The series is directed by Kristiina Hackel, written by Lorin Wertheimer and produced by Hackel and Wertheimer.

Awards, nominations and critical response
Speedie Date received positive reviews in NewTeeVee and Tubefilter. It was nominated for a 2009 Webby Award in the "Best Drama Series on the Web" category and was named an Official Honoree in the Drama: Individual Episode category that same year. It was also a semi-finalist in the Nextv 2009 Web Series competition.

Episode guide
 Heather and Mike: The long-time speed dater Mike tries to convince the skeptical first-timer Heather to stay and give speed dating a chance, while she tries to persuade him that he has been speed dating for too long and that it is time to try something new. Starring Rebecca Lowman and Phil Abrams.
 Amanda and Chad: The always positive Amanda and Chad find it difficult to connect until they start revealing their flaws. Starring Jillian Bach and Blair Hickey.
 Veronica and Moby: Married Veronica is just there to vet guys for her friend, but the more she starts to talk with kindred spirit Moby, the more she starts to fall for him. Starring Stephanie Venditto and Andrew Borba.
 Julie and Dorian: Julie and Dorian's playful exchange leaves both wanting more. Starring Patricia Melone and David Levine.
 Lisa and Malcolm: Lisa confronts Malcolm about the lies he told her on their last speed date. Starring Shae D'lyn and Jason Lansing.

External links
"A Long Date with Speedie's Lorin (Part 1)", interview at story2oh.com
 Speedie Date on Strike.TV

2008 web series debuts
American drama web series